Pakistan Development Forum is an international consortium that provides economic aid to Pakistan.

References

External links
 Assistance from lenders to be sought at PDF: $40bn projects
 Review of the Pakistan development forum
 Worldbank in Pakistan
 Oxfam reaction to Pakistan development forum

International development organizations